The following is a list of state highways in the U.S. state of Louisiana designated in the 950–999 range.


Louisiana Highway 950

Louisiana Highway 950 (LA 950) consisted of 17 road segments with a total length of approximately  that were located in the city of Baton Rouge, East Baton Rouge Parish.  The segments included portions of city streets, some which were pieces of former highway alignments, along with driveways within Louisiana State University and other state government complexes.

LA 950-1 ran  along North 3rd Street and Choctaw Drive from Dunbar Avenue to LA 67 (Plank Road).
LA 950-2 ran  along North 17th and Foss Streets from Ellerslie Drive to US 61/190 Bus. (Scenic Highway).
LA 950-3 ran  along North Street from US 61/190 Bus. (Scenic Highway) to LA 37 (North Foster Drive).
LA 950-4 ran  along North Boulevard from 22nd Street to LA 950-6 (Edison Street).
LA 950-5 ran  along Reymond Avenue, Eugene Street, and Buckner Drive from LA 427 (Perkins Road) to LA 950-4 (North Boulevard).
LA 950-6 ran  along Edison Street from LA 950-7 (Government Street) to LA 950-4 (North Boulevard).
LA 950-7 ran  along Government Street from St. Rose Avenue to LA 73 (South Foster Drive).
LA 950-8 ran  along Government Street and Lobdell Avenue in a loop off of LA 73 (Jefferson Highway).
LA 950-9 ran  along North Stadium and Dalrymple Drives from LA 30 (Nicholson Drive) to March Street.
LA 950-10 ran  along Highland Road from LA 30 (Nicholson Drive Extension) to Terrace Avenue.
LA 950-11 ran  along West Campus Drive from LA 950-10 (Highland Road) to LA 950-9 (Dalrymple Drive).
LA 950-12 ran  along South Stadium and South Campus Drives from LA 30 (Nicholson Drive) to LA 950-13 (Tower Drive).
LA 950-13 ran  along Tower Drive from LA 950-12 (South Campus Drive) to LA 950-9 (Dalrymple Drive).
LA 950-14 ran  along Raphael Semmes Road from LA 950-13 (Tower Drive) to LA 950-10 (Highland Road).
LA 950-15 ran  along Tower Circle from LA 950-14 (Raphael Semmes Road) to LA 950-9 (Dalrymple Drive).
LA 950-16 ran  within the Louisiana Department of Highways Testing Laboratory grounds off of LA 73 (South Foster Drive).
LA 950-17 ran  within the Louisiana State Police complex off of LA 73 (South Foster Drive).

Louisiana Highway 951

Louisiana Highway 952

Louisiana Highway 952 (LA 952) runs  in a southwest to northeast direction from LA 10 in Jackson to LA 68 in Wilson.

Louisiana Highway 953

Louisiana Highway 953 (LA 953) runs  in a southwest to northeast direction from a local road to LA 10 in McManus.  The route's mileposts increase from the northern or eastern end contrary to common practice.

Louisiana Highway 954

Louisiana Highway 954 (LA 954) runs  in a north–south direction from US 61 to LA 964 northwest of Zachary.

It is an undivided two-lane highway for its entire length.

Louisiana Highway 955

Louisiana Highway 955 (LA 955) runs  in a southwest to northeast direction from LA 412 west of Slaughter to LA 10 west of Clinton.

Louisiana Highway 956

Louisiana Highway 956 (LA 956) runs  in a general north–south direction from LA 412 east of Slaughter to LA 19 in Ethel.  The route's mileposts increase from the northern end contrary to common practice.

Louisiana Highway 957

Louisiana Highway 957 (LA 957) runs  in a north–south direction from LA 412 to LA 955 northeast of Slaughter.

Louisiana Highway 958

Louisiana Highway 958 (LA 958) runs  in a north–south direction from the East Baton Rouge Parish line to a junction with LA 959 east of Slaughter, East Feliciana Parish.  The route's mileposts increase from the northern end contrary to common practice.

Louisiana Highway 959

Louisiana Highway 959 (LA 959) runs  in an east–west direction from LA 67 northeast of Olive Branch to LA 63 northwest of Bluff Creek.

Louisiana Highway 960

Louisiana Highway 960 (LA 960) runs  in a north–south direction from LA 63 at Bluff Creek to a local road south of Hatchersville.

It is an undivided two-lane highway for its entire length.

Louisiana Highway 961

Louisiana Highway 961 (LA 961) runs  in a southwest to northeast direction from LA 10 to a local road northeast of Clinton.

It is an undivided two-lane highway for its entire length.

Louisiana Highway 962

Louisiana Highway 962 (LA 962) ran  in a southeast to northwest direction from LA 67 to a local road west of Woodland.

Louisiana Highway 963

Louisiana Highway 963 (LA 963) runs  in an east–west direction from LA 68 northeast of Jackson to LA 10 west of Clinton.

Louisiana Highway 964

Louisiana Highway 964 (LA 964) runs  in a general southeast to northwest direction from US 61 north of Baton Rouge, East Baton Rouge Parish to a local road at Riddle, West Feliciana Parish. As of 2018, a portion of LA 964 is under agreement to be removed from the state highway system and transferred to local control.

Louisiana Highway 965

Louisiana Highway 965 (LA 965) runs  in a southwest to northeast direction from a local road southeast of St. Francisville to LA 10 west of Jackson.

Louisiana Highway 966

Louisiana Highway 966 (LA 966) runs  in a southwest to northeast direction from US 61 to LA 965 east of St. Francisville.

Louisiana Highway 967

Louisiana Highway 967 (LA 967) runs  in a north–south direction from LA 421 northeast of Spillman to the Mississippi state line north of Cornor.

It is an undivided two-lane highway for its entire length.

Louisiana Highway 968

Louisiana Highway 968 (LA 968) runs  in a southwest to northeast direction from a local road to LA 66 south of Weyanoke.  The route's mileposts increase from the northern or eastern end contrary to common practice.

It is an undivided two-lane highway for its entire length.

Louisiana Highway 969

Louisiana Highway 969 (LA 969) runs  in a north–south direction from LA 66 to the Mississippi state line northwest of Weyanoke.

It is an undivided two-lane highway for its entire length.

Louisiana Highway 970

Louisiana Highway 970 (LA 970) runs  in a southwest to northeast direction from LA 417 at Jacoby to LA 418 northwest of Torras.

Louisiana Highway 971

Louisiana Highway 971 (LA 971) runs  in a northwest to southeast direction from LA 1 at Lettsworth to LA 418 at Williamsport.

It is an undivided two-lane highway for its entire length.

Louisiana Highway 972

Louisiana Highway 972 (LA 972) runs  in a southwest to northeast direction from LA 1 at Lacour Spur to LA 419 at Lacour.

It is an undivided two-lane highway for its entire length.

Prior to the 1955 Louisiana Highway renumbering, LA 972 was designated as State Route C-1372.

Louisiana Highway 973

Louisiana Highway 973 (LA 973) runs  in a north–south direction along Ben Sterling Road from a point near the Morganza Spillway levee to a junction with LA 417 south of Quinton.  The route's mileposts increase from the northern end contrary to common practice.

Louisiana Highway 974

Louisiana Highway 974 (LA 974) ran  in a north–south direction from a dead end to a junction with LA 10 west of Morganza.

Louisiana Highway 975

Louisiana Highway 975 (LA 975) runs  in a north–south direction primarily along the Atchafalaya River levee from a point south of I-10 in Iberville Parish to an interchange with US 190 in Pointe Coupee Parish opposite Krotz Springs.

Louisiana Highway 976

Louisiana Highway 976 (LA 976) runs  in a north–south direction from LA 81 to US 190 in an area west of Livonia known as Blanks.

It is an undivided two-lane highway for its entire length.

Louisiana Highway 977

Louisiana Highway 977 (LA 977) runs  in a north–south direction from LA 411 east of Maringouin, Iberville Parish to LA 77 south of Livonia, Pointe Coupee Parish.  The route has an anomaly in which the mileposts are reversed from the line of travel for the southernmost portion between LA 411 and LA 77 at Maringouin.

LA 977 is an undivided two-lane highway for its entire length.

Louisiana Highway 978

Louisiana Highway 978 (LA 978) runs  in a north–south direction along Bigman Lane from US 190 east of Livonia to LA 1 in Oscar.

The route's local name recalls Isaac Bigman, a plantation owner from the early 1900s.  Bigman owned a plantation at the end of present-day LA 978 and was also a local merchant in the area.  LA 978 is an undivided two-lane highway for its entire length.

Louisiana Highway 979

Louisiana Highway 979 (LA 979) runs  in an east–west direction from LA 78 north of Livonia to LA 978 east of Livonia.

It is an undivided two-lane highway for its entire length.

Louisiana Highway 980

Louisiana Highway 980 (LA 980) ran  in a north–south direction along West End Drive from LA 1 to a second junction with LA 1 and the concurrent LA 10 in New Roads.

Louisiana Highway 981

Louisiana Highway 981 (LA 981) runs  in a southeast to northwest direction from LA 415 east of New Roads to LA 420 north of New Roads.

It is an undivided two-lane highway for its entire length.

In 2011, LA 981 was extended slightly on its north end over part of LA 10 when the New Roads–St. Francisville Ferry closed due to the opening of the John James Audubon Bridge.

Louisiana Highway 982

Louisiana Highway 982 (LA 982) runs  in a southeast to northwest direction from LA 415 in Arbroth, West Baton Rouge Parish to LA 416 in Glynn, Pointe Coupee Parish.

It is an undivided two-lane highway for its entire length.

Prior to the 1955 Louisiana Highway renumbering, LA 982 was part of State Route 135.

Louisiana Highway 983

Louisiana Highway 983 (LA 983) runs  in a north–south direction from the concurrent US 190/LA 1 southeast of Erwinville, West Baton Rouge Parish to LA 414 at Chenal, Pointe Coupee Parish.

Louisiana Highway 984

Louisiana Highway 984 (LA 984) runs  in a southwest to northeast direction from LA 620 northeast of Erwinville to LA 415 south of Arbroth, West Baton Rouge Parish.

Louisiana Highway 985

Louisiana Highway 985 (LA 985) runs  in a southwest to northeast direction along Rosehill Drive from LA 983 southeast of Bueche to LA 415 at Alfords.

It is an undivided, two-lane highway for its entire length.

Prior to the 1955 Louisiana Highway renumbering, LA 985 was part of State Route C-1408.

Louisiana Highway 986

Louisiana Highway 986 (LA 986) runs  in a general north–south direction, making a loop from the junction of LA 76 and LA 415 west of Port Allen to a second junction with LA 415 north of Lobdell.

Louisiana Highway 987

Louisiana Highway 987 (LA 987) currently consists of five road segments with a total length of  that are located in the city of Port Allen and an unincorporated area of West Baton Rouge Parish to the north.  Since its creation, the system has been altered on three occasions.  LA 987-5 and LA 987-6 were deleted in 1972. LA 987-3 Spur was added in 2001 and deleted in 2013.  One of the original segments, LA 987-2, was deleted in 2015.

LA 987-1 runs  along Bridgeside Road from LA 1 to LA 986 (North River Road).
LA 987-2 ran  along Faye Avenue from LA 1 to LA 986 (North River Road).
LA 987-3 runs  along Lafiton Lane from LA 415 (Lobdell Highway) to LA 986 (North River Road).
LA 987-3 Spur ran  along Lafiton Lane from LA 415 (Lobdell Highway) to LA 987-3 (Plantation Avenue Loop).
LA 987-4 runs  along Court Street from LA 1 (Alexander Avenue) to LA 987-5 (South River Road).
LA 987-5 ran  along Oaks Avenue and South River Road from LA 987-6 (South Jefferson Avenue) to LA 987-4 (Court Street).
LA 987-6 ran  along South Jefferson Avenue from LA 987-5 (Oaks Avenue) to LA 987-4 (Court Street).

Louisiana Highway 988

Louisiana Highway 988 (LA 988) runs  in a north–south direction from LA 1 in Plaquemine, Iberville Parish to a second junction with LA 1 south of Port Allen, West Baton Rouge Parish.

Louisiana Highway 989

Louisiana Highway 989 (LA 989) consists of two road segments with a total length of  that are located in the West Baton Rouge Parish town of Brusly and an unincorporated area between Brusly and the neighboring town of Addis.

LA 989-1 runs  along Choctaw Road and Lukeville Lane from a dead end at the Gulf Intracoastal Waterway to a junction with LA 988.
LA 989-2 runs  along Choctaw Road, South Labauve Avenue, and Main Street from LA 989-1 to LA 988.

Louisiana Highway 990

Louisiana Highway 990 (LA 990) runs  in an east–west direction from the intersection of two local roads to a junction with LA 988 in Addis.

LA 990 is an undivided two-lane highway for its entire length.  The route's mileposts increase from the eastern end contrary to common practice.

Prior to the 1955 Louisiana Highway renumbering, LA 990 was designated as State Route 133.

As of 2017, the portion of LA 990 west of LA 1 is under agreement to be removed from the state highway system and transferred to local control.

Louisiana Highway 991

Louisiana Highway 991 (LA 991) runs  in a southwest to northeast direction from LA 75 east of Plaquemine to LA 327 in St. Gabriel.

Louisiana Highway 992

Louisiana Highway 992 (LA 992) currently consists of one road segment with a total length of  that is located in and near the Iberville Parish city of Plaquemine.  Two of the original three segments were deleted from the state highway system between 1960 and 1970.

LA 992-1 ran  from LA 1 to LA 77 (Bayou Jacob Road).
LA 992-2 ran  along Pecan Boulevard from LA 1 to a point near the present junction of LA 75 and LA 992-3.
LA 992-3 runs  along St. Louis Road and Tenant Road from LA 1 to LA 75.

Louisiana Highway 993

Louisiana Highway 993 (LA 993) runs  in a southwest to northeast direction from a local road in Lone Star to the concurrent LA 69/LA 405 west of White Castle.

Louisiana Highway 994

Louisiana Highway 994 (LA 994) runs  in an east–west direction along Ourso Road from the intersection of two local roads to LA 993 southwest of White Castle.

Louisiana Highway 995

Louisiana Highway 995 (LA 995) runs  in a general east–west direction from LA 69 to a private road south of White Castle.

Louisiana Highway 996

Louisiana Highway 996 (LA 996) runs  in a general southeast to northwest direction from LA 70 east of Grand Bayou, Assumption Parish to LA 69 north of the Iberville Parish line.

Louisiana Highway 997

Louisiana Highway 997 (LA 997) runs  in a north–south direction from LA 70 in an area of St. Martin west of Belle River to LA 75 in Bayou Pigeon, Iberville Parish. The route's mileposts increase from the northern end contrary to common practice.

Louisiana Highway 998

Louisiana Highway 998 (LA 998) runs  in a northwest to southeast direction from a local road to LA 308 north of Paincourtville.  The route's mileposts increase from the eastern end contrary to common practice.

Louisiana Highway 999

Louisiana Highway 999 (LA 999) runs  in a northwest to southeast direction along Lula Road from the Lula Sugar Factory to a junction with LA 1 north of Paincourtville.  The route's mileposts increase from the eastern end contrary to common practice.

See also

References

External links
Maps / GIS Data Homepage, Louisiana Department of Transportation and Development